Club Deportivo Villanueva was a Spanish football team based in Villanueva de Córdoba, in the autonomous community of Andalusia. Founded in 1951 and dissolved in June 2009, it held home matches at Estadio San Miguel, with a capacity of 4,500 seats.

History
Villanueva first reached the fourth division in 1999, after nearly 50 years in the regional leagues. At the end of the 2004–05 season, after two unsuccessful playoff visits, the club reached the third level for the first time ever.

Villanueva returned to division four after two seasons, finishing 18th in 2006–07. At the end of the 2008–09 campaign, the team did not present itself for two matches, losing its berth in the competition.

Subsequently, Villanueva was automatically inscribed in Primera Andaluza, dropping another level if it decided not to enroll. Finally, in July 2009, the club was dissolved due to asphyxiant debts, leaving Atlético Villanueva as the most representative team in the city.

Season to season

2 seasons in Segunda División B
7 seasons in Tercera División

Famous players
 Javi Lara

References

Association football clubs established in 1951
Association football clubs disestablished in 2009
Defunct football clubs in Andalusia
1951 establishments in Spain
2009 disestablishments in Spain